Björn Lövin (17 December 1937 – 6 March 2009) was a Swedish painter, sculptor and installation artist. During his lifetime he had solo exhibitions at Moderna Museet, Göteborgs Konsthall, Liljevalchs konsthall, Kulturhuset and in Paris at the Centre Pompidou.

Björn Lövin was the father of politician and former Deputy Prime Minister of Sweden, Isabella Lövin.

References

Further reading
Björn Lövin: Konsument i oändligheten och Herr P:s penningar. Stockholm: Moderna Museet, 1971.
af Petersens, Magnus (ed.). Björn Lövin: X Marks the Thought. Stockholm: Moderna Museet, 2009.
Olof-Ors, Matilda (ed.). Björn Lövin: The Surrounding Reality. Stockholm: Moderna Museet, 2022.

Swedish contemporary artists
1937 births
2009 deaths